Mad to Be Normal is a 2017 British drama film directed by Robert Mullan and written by Robert Mullan and Tracy Moreton. The film stars David Tennant, Elisabeth Moss, Gabriel Byrne, Michael Gambon, David Bamber, Olivia Poulet and Trevor White. The film was released on 6 April 2017 by GSP Studios International.

Plot
The film portrays the story of Scottish psychiatrist R. D. Laing. Working out of Kingsley Hall in East London throughout the 1960s and 1970s, Laing performed various experiments on people diagnosed as mentally disturbed. His unconventional methods included a form of self-healing known as metanoia, causing controversy in the medical profession and later radically changing perceptions of mental health around the world.

Cast  
David Tennant as R. D. Laing
Elisabeth Moss as Angie Wood
Gabriel Byrne as Jim
Michael Gambon as Sydney Kotok
David Bamber as Dr. Meredith
Olivia Poulet as Maria
Trevor White as Bryan
Rebecca Gethings as Jane Simons
Nigel Barber as Dr. Bloom
Caitlin Innes Edwards as Mrs. Kotok
Adam Paul Harvey as Paul Zemmell
Jerome Holder as John Holding
Kelby Keenan as Olivia Kennan
James Utechin as Sam
Helen Belbin as Amelia
Lydia Orange as Sarah
Matthew Jure as Richard Long
Jamie Edgerton as Barman
Darren Whitfield as Cockney
Alex Walton as Sean
Tom Richards as Raymond
Linda Hargreaves as Mrs. Holding
Isaac Benn as R. D.Laing as a Child
Aaron Taylor as Pieter Kotok
Alexandra Finnie as Suzie Laing
Declan Wilson as Mr. Holding
Lanna Joffrey as Eleanor Goodhart 
Maya Chesca Miles as Fran Klein
Sam Booth as Alex
Lucie Glynn as Joan
Ruby Winter as Karen Laing
Cia Allan as Mrs. Walker
Redford Glynn as Baby Gabriel
Wendy Barrett as Anne Laing
Peter F. Gardiner as David Laing
Nicola Kemp-Simonds as Nina

Release
The film premiered at the Glasgow Film Festival on 26 February 2017. The film was released on 6 April 2017 by GSP Studios International.

Reception
On review aggregator website Rotten Tomatoes, the film holds an approval rating of 64% based on 22 reviews, and an average rating of 6.3/10.

References

External links
 
 

2017 films
2017 drama films
British drama films
Films about psychiatry
2010s English-language films
2010s British films